Radio City is a commercial radio station located in the city of Maribor, Slovenia, which broadcasts on three radio frequencies. It can be heard from northeastern part of the country on the frequency of 100.6 MHz (Maribor), 100.8 MHz (Celje) and 99.5 MHz (Ljubljana). It is also available on the internet through their official website.

Broadcasts began in 1996 in Maribor from the HQ in Slovenski ulici 35.

According to various opinion polls, Radio City is most listened commercial radio station in the Slovenian Styria.  One of the most recognizable elements of the radio station is the trio known under the slogan "Not us", which consists of Dejan Vedlin (moderator of the morning program between 5 and 9 am), Matjaž Šalamun - Šalca, and Tine Križanič - Tinček.

See also
List of radio stations in Slovenia

External links
 Official website

Radio stations in Slovenia
Mass media in Maribor
1995 establishments in Slovenia